Bizzi is an Italian surname. Notable people with the surname include:

Emilio Bizzi (born 1933), Italian neuroscientist 
Marino Bizzi (1570–1624), Italian prelate
Olimpio Bizzi (1916–1976), Italian cyclist 

Italian-language surnames